John William Thomson (born 28 December 1928) was a Progressive Conservative party member of the House of Commons of Canada. He was a businessman by career.

He represented the Alberta riding of Calgary South at which he won election in 1979 and again in 1980. After serving two terms in the 31st and 32nd Canadian Parliaments, Thomson did not campaign for re-election in 1984 and left national politics.

Thomson made an earlier, unsuccessful attempt at gaining an Ontario House of Commons seat at Etobicoke in the 1974 federal election against incumbent Alastair Gillespie.

External links
 

1928 births
Living people
Members of the House of Commons of Canada from Alberta
Politicians from Toronto
Progressive Conservative Party of Canada MPs